Cymindis punctigera is a species of ground beetle in the subfamily Harpalinae. It was described by John Lawrence LeConte in 1851.

References

punctigera
Beetles described in 1851